Washington Prime Group Inc. is an American real estate investment trust that invests in shopping centers. The company is organized in Indiana with its headquarters in Columbus, Ohio. From January 2015 to September 2016, the company had the name WP Glimcher. On June 13, 2021, Washington Prime filed for Chapter 11 bankruptcy.

Investments

Properties owned by the company include the following:

History
On May 28, 2014, the company, which at that time owned interests in 98 shopping centers, was spun off by Simon Property Group.

In June 2014, the company acquired its partner's 50% interest in Clay Terrace for $22.9 million.

In January 2015, the company acquired Glimcher Realty Trust in a $4.3 billion transaction and the company was renamed as WP Glimcher. As part of the transaction, Jersey Gardens in Elizabeth, New Jersey and University Park Village in Fort Worth, Texas, were sold to Simon Property Group, while WP Glimcher acquired Brunswick Square in East Brunswick, New Jersey and Jefferson Valley Mall in Yorktown Heights, New York from Simon.

On June 20, 2016, CEO Michael P. Glimcher resigned from the company and Louis G. Conforti was named chief executive officer.

In September 2016, the company changed its name back to Washington Prime Group. The company also sold Knoxville Center for $10.15 million.

In May 2017, the company sold a stake in six mall properties for $340 million.

In June 2021, Washington Prime Group filed for bankruptcy.

References

External links
 

 
2015 establishments in Ohio
Companies based in Ohio
Real estate investment trusts of the United States
Shopping center management firms
Companies that filed for Chapter 11 bankruptcy in 2021
Companies formerly listed on the New York Stock Exchange
Companies traded over-the-counter in the United States